The Mike Lockwood Memorial Tournament was a professional wrestling memorial event produced by the New Breed Wrestling Association (NBWA) promotion, which took place on March 18, 2005 at ZB Falcons in South Bend, Indiana. It was the second of two memorial shows held in memory of Mike Lockwood, who committed suicide at his home in Navarre, Florida on November 6, 2003, with a first show run by Pro Wrestling Iron, the Mike Lockwood Memorial Show, in Lathrop, California two years earlier. Eight professional wrestling matches were featured on the event's card, with one including championships.

Michael Modest won the tournament by winning three matches at the event. Over the course of the evening, he defeated Dustin Thomas in the quarter-finals, the Shark Boy in the semi-finals and Jamie Noble in the final match. In addition to the tournament, the main event was a standard wrestling match for the NBWA Heavyweight Championship between the champion, Nigel McGuiness, and the challenger, B. J. Whitmer, in which Whitmer won the championship.

Results
March 18, 2005 in South Bend, Indiana (ZB Falcons)

Tournament brackets
This was a one-night tournament which took place on March 18, 2005. The tournament brackets were:

References

External links
Mike Lockwood Memorial Tournament official results at NewBreedWrestling.net

Professional wrestling memorial shows
2005 in professional wrestling
Professional wrestling tournaments
Professional wrestling in Indiana